Vanderpump Rules After Show is an American reality talk show that premiered on Bravo on November 16, 2015. It was developed as the first spin-off of Vanderpump Rules.

Overview 
Vanderpump Rules features Lisa Vanderpump, one of the main original cast members of The Real Housewives of Beverly Hills, in the title role and the staff at her restaurants SUR Restaurant & Lounge and Pump Restaurant located in West Hollywood, California, both of which are owned, or co-owned, by Vanderpump. Vanderpump Rules After Show features conversations between the cast members of Vanderpump Rules discussing the same week's events and answering questions about their lives both on and off the show. The talk show is hosted by Julie Goldman and Brandy Howard.

The series, which premiered airing concurrent to season four of Vanderpump Rules, didn't return to air concurrent to season 5 of the series, nor has it aired any further episodes online.

Episodes

Broadcast 
Vanderpump Rules After Show airs on the Bravo cable network in the United States; the first episode premiered on Friday at 9:00/8:00pm ET/PT. on November 6, 2015. Two subsequent episodes aired in the same timeslot. Starting with the fourth episode which aired November 23, the show moved to 11:30/10:30pm timeslot on Monday, the same night when Vanderpump Rules airs. Internationally, the series premiered in Australia on Arena on November 24, 2015, within hours of the American broadcast.

References

External links 
 
 

2010s American reality television series
2015 American television series debuts
2016 American television series endings
Bravo (American TV network) original programming
English-language television shows
American television talk shows
The Real Housewives spin-offs
American television spin-offs
Reality television spin-offs